Ahmed Madan may refer to:
 Ahmed Madan (cyclist)
 Ahmed Madan (poet)